List of catholicoi (a title of heads of many Eastern churches - singular catholicos):

List of Catholicoi of Armenia
List of Armenian Catholicoi of Cilicia
List of Armenian Catholic Catholicos-Patriarchs of Cilicia
List of Catholicoi and Patriarchs of Babylon for the Chaldeans
List of Catholicoi of Seleucia-Ctesiphon and Patriarchs of the East
List of Catholicos of the East
List of Catholicoi-Patriarchs of All Georgia
List of Caucasian Albanian Catholicoi

See also
Catholicos
Catholicos of All Armenians
Catholicos of The East and Malankara Metropolitan
Catholicos-Patriarch of All Georgia
Catholicos of India
Lists of Patriarchs